This is a list of episodes from 2011 for the Stuff You Should Know podcast

2011 season

References

External links 
 Podcast Archive

Lists of radio series episodes